Pakicetidae ("Pakistani whales") is an extinct family of Archaeoceti (early whales) that lived during the Early Eocene in Pakistan.

Description
 described the first pakicetid, Ichthyolestes, but at the time they did not recognize it as a cetacean, identifying it, instead, it as a fish-eating mesonychid. Robert West was the first to identify pakicetids as cetaceans in 1980 and, after discovering a braincase, Phillip Gingerich and Donald Russell described the genus Pakicetus in 1981. On October 26, 2016, a publication represented the idea that the emergence of cetacea in the Paleogene presents the best idea of microevolution that resulted in the phenotype of pakicetid. During the following two decades, more research resulted in additional pakicetid cranial material and by 2001 postcranial material for the family had been described. Though all parts of pakicetid postcrania are known, no complete skeleton from a single individual has been recovered.
The pakicetid goldmine is the "H-GSP Locality 62" site in the Kala Chitta Hills where fossils from all three genera have been found.  However, this site is so littered with bones that identifying bones from a single individual is impossible, and pakicetid skeletons are consequently composites of bones from several individuals.

Pakicetids have been found in or near river deposits in northern Pakistan and northwestern India, a region which was probably arid with only temporary streams when these animals lived there. No pakicetids have been found in marine deposits, and they were apparently terrestrial or freshwater animals. Their long limbs and small hands and feet also indicate they were poor swimmers. Their bones are heavy and compact and were probably used as ballast; they clearly indicate pakicetids were not fast runners notwithstanding their otherwise cursorial morphology. Most likely, pakicetids lived in or near bodies of freshwater and their diet could have included both land animals and aquatic organisms. During the Eocene, Pakistan was a coastal region of the Eurasian land mass and therefore an ideal habitat for the evolution, and diversification of the Pakicetids.

Hearing
Pakicetid ears had an external auditory meatus and ear ossicles (i.e. incus, malleus, tympanic ring, etcetera) similar to those in living land mammals and most likely used normal land mammal hearing in air. In the pakicetid mandible, the mandibular foramen is small and comparable in size to those of extant land mammals and the acoustic mandibular fat pad characteristic of later whales was obviously not present. The lateral wall of the mandible is also relatively thick in pakicetids, further preventing sound transmission through the jaw. The tympanic bulla in pakicetid ears is similar to those in all cetaceans, with a relatively thin lateral wall and thickened medial part known as the involucrum. However, in contrast to later cetaceans, the tympanic bone makes contact with the periotic bone which is firmly attached to the skull leaving no space for isolating air sinuses, effectively preventing directional hearing in water. Pakicetids most likely used bone conduction for hearing in water.

Locomotion

Interpretations of pakicetid habitat and locomotion behaviour varies considerably:

In 2001, it was concluded by Thiwissen et al. that "pakicetids were terrestrial mammals, no more amphibious than a tapir." According to them, none of the aquatic adaptations found in the oldest obligate aquatic cetaceans, basilosaurids and dorudontids, are present in pakicetids. Pakicetid cervical vertebrae are longer than in late Eocene whales, the thoracic vertebrae increase in size from the neck backwards, and the lumbar and caudal vertebrae are longer than in modern cetaceans (but still shorter than in some extinct cetaceans with undulating spines.) Motion in the spine of pakicetids was further reduced by the revolute zygapophyses (processes between the vertebrae) like in stiff-backed runners such as mesonychians. The sacral vertebrae are fused and the sacroiliac joints present like in land mammals and amphibious cetaceans.

Furthermore, according to Thewissenet al., the pakicetid scapulae have large supraspinous fossae with small acromions, in contrast to other cetaceans. The deltopectoral crests are absent in the long and slender humeri like in cursorial animals but unlike other Eocene cetaceans.  Pakicetid elbows are rigid hinge joints like in running mammals and the forearms are not flattened like in truly aquatic cetaceans. In the pakicetid pelvis, the innominates are large and the ischia are longer than the ilia.  The pakicetid tibiae are long with a short tibial crest. Hindlimb features that all more reminiscent of running and jumping animals than swimming animals.

 disagreed and got support from : postcranial morphology and microstructural features suggest that pakicetids were adapted to an aquatic lifestyle which included bottom wading, paddling, and undulatory swimming, but probably not sustained running.  Isotopic evidence indicate Pakicetids spent a considerable part of their life in freshwater and probably ate freshwater prey.

Subtaxa
 Family Pakicetidae
 Ichthyolestes
 Ichtyolestes pinfoldi
 Nalacetus
 Nalacetus ratimitus
 Pakicetus
 Pakicetus inachus
 Pakicetus attocki
 Pakicetus calcis
 Pakicetus chittas

See also

 Archaeoceti
 Evolution of cetaceans

Notes

References

 
 
 
 
 
 
 
 
 
  
 
 
 

 
Eocene first appearances
Eocene extinctions
Prehistoric mammal families